Sheikh Ibrahim Sheikh Yusuf Sheikh Madar (died on 23 July 2004) served as the elected chairman of the SNM in January 1982  and later served as the Guurti leader in the Somaliland Parliament from 1993 until his death. Madar belongs to the Sa'ad Musa sub-division of the Habr Awal Isaaq clan and is the grandson of the famous Sheikh Madar.

References 

 
1980s in Somalia
History of Somaliland
Speakers of the House of Elders (Somaliland)
1920s births
2004 deaths